Robert Anthony Hyman (1928-2011) was a British historian of computing writer.

Anthony Hyman wrote especially on the early Victorian computer pioneer, Charles Babbage (1791–1871). He liaised with the London Science Museum, the Royal Society, the Crawford Library, the Oxford Museum of the History of Science, the Cambridge University Library, the Edinburgh Royal Observatory for source material.

Selected publications
Hyman published the following books:

References

1928 births
Living people
20th-century non-fiction writers
Historians of science
British historians of mathematics
Historians of technology
Computer science writers
British science writers
British technology writers
British male writers
Male non-fiction writers
Charles Babbage